{{Taxobox
| name = Lyticum
| domain = Bacteria
| phylum = Pseudomonadota
| classis = Alphaproteobacteria
| ordo = Rickettsiales
| familia = Ehrlichiaceae
| genus = Lyticum
| binomial_authority =  (ex Preer et al. 1974) Preer and Preer 1982
| type_species = L. flagellatum 
| subdivision_ranks = Species 
}}Lyticum is a genus in the phylum Pseudomonadota (Bacteria).

Etymology
The name Lyticum derives from:New Latin lyticus (from Greek lutikos, λυτικός), able to loosen, able to dissolve; to give Lyticum, dissolver.

Species
The genus contains two species (including basonyms and synonyms):
 L. flagellatum ( (ex Preer et al. 1974) Preer and Preer 1982, nom. rev. (type species of the genus)
 L. sinuosum ( (ex Preer et al''. 1974) Preer and Preer 1982, nom. rev.

See also
 Bacterial taxonomy
 Microbiology

References 

Rickettsiales
Bacteria genera